is a Japanese politician of the Democratic Party of Japan, a former Senator in the House of Councillors of the Diet (national legislature). A native of Tokyo, he graduated from Rikkyo University and received a master's degree from the University of Dallas in the United States. He was elected for the first time in 2004 from his Nagasaki constituency.

Early years
In 1977, Senator Inuzuka graduated from Rikkyo University in Tokyo, Japan where he obtained a bachelor's degree in Business Administration. He also obtained an MBA from University of Dallas Graduate School of Management.

Before entering the political sphere, Inuzuka worked for the ALC publishing company. To this day, writing remains a great passion and in June 2010, he published his first book 脱主権国家への挑戦 about his political experience and policy.

Career
Inuzuka is the president of a Japan-Hawaii based hotel & real-estate company and has also opened and operated restaurants in Tokyo.
Most recently, he ran the Okushiga-Kogen Ski Resort in Nagano.
Inuzuka is also a founding member of Doctor's of the World Japan.

Politics
In 2000, Inuzuka was selected as a candidate by the Democratic Party of Japan to run for a seat in the House of Representative from the Nagasaki constituency. In 2004, he was elected to the House of Councillors (equivalent to the Senate in the United States) in the National Diet of Japan. His campaign goals were 1) to ensure that Japan ratify the International Criminal Court (ICC) 2) to advocate for those still suffering from the atomic bomb's radioactive effects 3) that Nagasaki focus on reinvesting in the local community's businesses as opposed to building wasteful infrastructure. Inuzuka argues that long run effects of inefficient construction projects are detrimental as they only solve the short term unemployment problem instead of creating a long-term sustainable solution that reinvesting in local businesses can provide. He has suggested that the government provide a "Nagasaki Fund"—a microfinance mechanism to invest in small businesses so that the local community may grow together. The unemployment rate will go down as the private sector regains its economic foothold through effective micro financing.

Placing human security in the center of his policy scheme, Inuzuka aims to build a new post-cold war framework for global peace and security. Accordingly, he has thrived in his campaign for Japan's accession to the International Criminal Court or ICC. After three years of aggressive campaigning in the Diet, Inuzuka managed to become one of the leading forces behind Japan's accession to the ICC on July 17, 2007, incidentally on the World Day for International Justice, exactly nine years from the adoption of the Rome Statute of the International Criminal Court.

Following his success in the ICC campaign, Inuzuka is now a strong advocate for the establishment of the proposed UN Emergency Peace Service or UNEPS, which is a permanent emergency response service designed to supplement the U.N.’s capacity to provide stability, peace, and relief in humanitarian crisis situations. Being a strong advocate for peace and stability, Inuzuka supports the central idea of UNEPS that it will be composed of willing individuals who work directly under the auspices of the Security Council and not of military troops from contributing states.

Party posts 
Vice Minister of Foreign Affairs of the Next Cabinet, 2nd Ozawa Cabinet

Committee posts 
Director, Special Committee on Official Development Assistance and Related Matters
 Director, Member, Committee on Foreign Affairs and Defence
 Director, Committee on Budget

Social posts 
Inuzuka holds several social posts besides his career as Senator in the House of Councillors of the Japanese Diet.
 Board Member and Deputy Convenor of the International Law and Human Rights Programme, Parliamentarians for Global Action
 Founding member, Medécins Du Monde
 Board member, PlaNet Finance
 Board member, World Federalist Movement

See also 
 Human security
 Responsibility to protect
 International Criminal Court

References

External links 
 Official party profile in English.
 Official blog site in Japanese.
 Official policy site in English.
 Medécins Du Monde part in English.
 Global Action to Prevent War and Armed Conflict, the New York-based Secretariat for UNEPS.
 Parliamentarians for Global Action, a New York-based organization composed of world's parliamentarians
 Be the 1, specialized recruitment firm

Members of the House of Councillors (Japan)
University of Dallas alumni
Living people
1954 births
Democratic Party of Japan politicians
Rikkyo University alumni